The Research Organization for Health (OR Kesehatan) is one of Research Organizations under the umbrella of the National Research and Innovation Agency (BRIN). The organization is transformation of National Institute of Health Research and Development (Balitbangkes) of Ministry of Health (Kemenkes).

On 24 January 2022, it is announced that the organization extended with fusion of elements from Eijkman Molecular Biology Research Center, and Indonesian Research Center for Veterinary Sciences from Ministry of Agriculture. OR Kesehatan formation is finalized on 1 March 2022 and is functional since 4 March 2022.

History 
In response of formation of National Research and Innovation Agency as independent agency under the President of Indonesia, the Ministry of Health rearranged their research and development activities which had been organized thru its Balitbangkes. In the plan, Balitbangkes will be transformed into Agency for Health Policies Development (BKPK), a regulatory agency intended to provide only policies and standards making for state health activity, no longer doing research as the research part will be relinquished to BRIN.

On 7 November 2021, the Ministry issued order to Balitbangkes and its child agencies to halt their activities per 31 December 2021 as unit under auspices of Ministry of Health, effectively started the dismantlement of Balitbangkes. In the order, Balitbangkes will split into three parts: one part (which is the most) relinquished to BRIN, one part to become BKPK, and the rest of the Balitbangkes part in regional level will be relinquished to local government where the Balitbangkes branch formerly existed for being transformed into local-government run public health laboratories for being integrated as part of state public health laboratories system. 

In 30 November 2021, BRIN announced that ORKG (tentative name of the future OR Kesehatan, as the organization yet to be formed formally at that time), transformation of the previously from Balitbangkes of will be activated and operated soon. On 24 January 2022, it is announced that the organization extended with Eijkman Molecular Biology Research Center and Indonesian Research Center for Veterinary Sciences from Ministry of Agriculture. It is announced that the organization expected to be formed on 1 February 2022 and named as OR Kesehatan instead of ORKG.

On 4 March 2022, OR Kesehatan is fully functional with inauguration of its first head, Ni Luh Putu Indi Dharmayanti.

Structure 
The structure of OR Kesehatan is as follows:

 Office of the Head of OR Kesehatan
 Research Center for Biomedical Research
 Research Center for Preclinical and Clinical Medicine
 Research Center for Public Health and Nutrition
 Research Center for Pharmaceutical Ingredients and Traditional Medicine
 Research Center for Vaccine and Drug
 Eijkman Research Center of Molecular Biology
 Research Center for Veterinary Science
 Research Groups

List of Heads

References 

Science and technology in Indonesia
Research institutes in Indonesia
2022 establishments in Indonesia
National Research and Innovation Agency